Mabel Constance Hardy married name Mabel Smith (1879-1947) was an English international badminton player.

Badminton career
Hardy was a winner of the All England Open Badminton Championships after winning the women's 1903 All England Badminton Championships doubles with Dorothea Douglass Lambert Chambers. She was also a singles and mixed doubles finalist at the 1905 All England Badminton Championships.

Additionally she won the Irish Open doubles in 1903 and mixed doubles in 1903 and 1904. After marrying Lionel Smith in 1905 she competed under her married name of Smith.

References

English female badminton players
1879 births
1947 deaths